Krishnampalli is a village that comes under Melpatti post, Gudiyatham taluk, Vellore district of Tamil Nadu. The village lies on the road to Gudiyattam from Pernambut via Melpatti.

The most spoken language in this village is Telugu and secondly Tamil.

The village has a primary school which was started in 1987.  

The village is surrounded by few small hills, and villages. The main source of income is agriculture, though the area suffers from drought.  The literacy rate among the current generation is above 90%.

Villages in Vellore district